Laranda may refer to :

 Laranda (Lycaonia), also spelled Larende, an ancient city and former bishopric of Lycaonia, today Karaman in south-central Turkey and a Latin Catholic titular see
 Laranda (Cataonia), a town of ancient Cataonia
 An alternate spelling of Larunda (also known as Larunde or Lara), a nymph in Ancient Roman myth
 Laranda (insect), a genus of Phalangopsidae cricket